The 1983–84 Miami Redskins men's basketball team represent Miami University in the 1983–84 NCAA Division I men's basketball season. The Redskins, led by 14th-year head coach Darrell Hedric, played their home games at Millett Hall in Oxford, Ohio as members of the Mid-American Conference. The team finished atop the conference regular season standings, and followed that success by winning the MAC tournament to earn an automatic bid to the NCAA tournament. As the No. 8 seed in the West region, Miami was beaten by No. 9 seed SMU in the opening round, 83–69.

Roster

Schedule and results

|-
!colspan=9 style=| Non-conference regular season

|-
!colspan=9 style=| MAC regular season

|-
!colspan=9 style=| MAC tournament

|-
!colspan=9 style=| NCAA tournament

Source

References

Miami RedHawks men's basketball seasons
Miami (OH)
Miami (OH)